Pedro Johannes van Raamsdonk (born October 2, 1960 in Amsterdam, North Holland) is a retired boxer from the Netherlands, who competed for his native country at the 1984 Summer Olympics in Los Angeles, California. There he was stopped in the quarterfinals of the middleweight division (– 75 kg) by eventual bronze medalist Arístides González of Puerto Rico.

Van Raamsdonk is the first and so far the only boxer without an American passport (he is from the Netherlands) who fought in the National Golden Gloves. He won in 1980 the California Golden Gloves and the bronze medal at the 1981 National Golden Gloves in Toledo (Ohio)

External links
 Dutch Olympic Committee
 sports-reference

1960 births
Living people
Middleweight boxers
Boxers at the 1984 Summer Olympics
Olympic boxers of the Netherlands
Boxers from Amsterdam
Dutch male boxers
AIBA World Boxing Championships medalists